John Alden Thayer (December 22, 1857 – July 31, 1917)  was a Representative from Massachusetts.

He was born in Worcester, Massachusetts. He was the son of Eli Thayer. He graduated from Harvard College in 1879. He studied law at Columbia Law School in New York City. He was admitted to the bar in 1889 and was a clerk of the central district court of Worcester from 1892 to 1897.

He was elected as a Democrat to the Sixty-second Congress from March 4, 1911 to March 3, 1913. He failed reelection in 1912 to the Sixty-third Congress. He was a delegate to the Democratic National Convention in 1912. In 1915, he was appointed postmaster of Worcester, and served until his death.

Hospitilazation and death
In mid July 1917 Thayer was admitted into the Peter Bent Brigham Hospital in Boston where he died on July 31, 1917.

References

Bibliography
The Boston Globe, John Alden Thayer of Worcester Dead; Postmaster Passes Away in Boston Hospital Third District Elected Him to Congress in 1910 August 1, 1917), p. 14.
Who's who in State Politics, 1912 Practical Politics  (1912) p. 27.
 

1857 births
1917 deaths
Harvard University alumni
Columbia Law School alumni
Politicians from Worcester, Massachusetts
Clerks
Democratic Party members of the United States House of Representatives from Massachusetts
19th-century American politicians